1980–81 Serie A1 was the thirty-sixth men's volleyball major Italian championship; it was won by Turin-based team Klippan, which got its third title in a row.

Format
Twelve contestants took part to a simple round-robin tournament, earning two points for each win. In the end, the final chart-leading team won the title, while bottom two teams were relegated in the lower division.

Teams

Key dates
8 November 1980: opening day of the tournament. The defending champion, Robe di Kappa Torino (who enrolled Dimitar Zlatanov), easily defeated Radio CUS Pisa 3–0 (15–2, 15–1, 15–6), while its most accredited rival for the title, Santàl Parma, with newcomers Negri and Lanfranco), lost in Loreto 2–3 (15–8, 15–6, 7–15, 14–16, 13–15).
22 November 1980: Robe di Kappa defeated 3–1 Torre Tabita Catania, its rival during 1979–80 season and maintained the first place in the classification, along with Edilcuoghi Sassuolo, Polenghi Milano and Panini Modena (3:0); on the contrary, Torre Tabita was occupying last place (0:3).
10 December 1980: Edilcuoghi lost its first match (0–3 in Rome), while Robe di Kappa beat Panini Modena 3–1 away (9–15, 15–11, 15–11, 15–13) and reached the solitary top of the chart (6:0).
24 January 1981:  winning also on Edilcuoghi's ground 3–1 (4–15, 14–16, 11–15, 6–15) Robe di Kappa (11:0) was firmly maintaining the top of the chart after the first half of the season. Panini Modena was occupying the second place (9:2).
21 February 1981: Robe di Kappa beat Toseroni Roma 3–0 (15–7, 15–8, 15–10) and, after 15 rounds, was full score with 30 points, 4 more than Panini (second place) and 10 more than Toseroni and Santàl (third place).
7 March 1981: defeating runner-up Panini Modena 3–0 at Palaruffini, Robe di Kappa extend its advantage in the league table to 8 points.
21 March 1981: Robe di Kappa knocked off Amaro Più Loreto 3–0 (15–7, 15–9, 15–10) and won its third title in a row with 3 matches still to play.
11 April 1981: in the last round, Robe di Kappa beat Edilcuoghi 3–1 (6–15, 15–11, 15–3, 15–2) and closed its tournament unbeaten, with a 22:0 score (fifteen matches won 3–0 and seven 3–1); Torre Tabita was unpredictably relegated.

League table

Legend:

Results

References

Bibliography
La Stampa, years 1980 and 1981.

External links
Official Lega Pallavolo Serie A Site

Men's volleyball competitions in Italy
1980 in volleyball
1981 in volleyball